The 1959 ICF Canoe Slalom World Championships were held in Geneva, Switzerland under the auspices of International Canoe Federation for the second time. It was the 6th edition. The mixed C2 team event was not held at these championships after taking place in the previous one. The Swiss city hosted the championships previously in 1949.

Medal summary

Men's

Canoe

Kayak

Mixed

Canoe

Women's

Kayak

Medal table

References

External links
International Canoe Federation

Icf Canoe Slalom World Championships, 1959
Icf Canoe Slalom World Championships, 1959
ICF Canoe Slalom World Championships
International sports competitions hosted by Switzerland
Sports competitions in Geneva
20th century in Geneva